= US3 carriers =

The US3 carriers commonly refer to three full-service airlines based in the United States:

- American Airlines
- Delta Air Lines
- United Airlines
